The 1943 Wayne Tartars football team represented Wayne University (later renamed Wayne State University) as an independent during the 1943 college football season. The team compiled a 0–3 record and was outscored by opponents, 64 to 0.

Joe Gembis was in his 12th year as head coach. Frank Bielman, Jr., was the team captain.

As the fall semester began, there was uncertainty as to whether Wayne would be able to field a football team. Many schools had cancelled the football season due to the loss of students to wartime military service. Because Wayne had no Navy or Marine program, and the prior year's players were in the military, the team would have to be formed from incoming freshmen. Coach Gembis noted at the time: "We want to have a football team, even if we play only two games."

In late September 1943, a team was formed with 35 players. Coach Gembis arranged for a home and home series with Michigan State Normal and wrote to the commissioner of the Ohio Athletic Conference in search of other opponents.

A fourth game was arranged with Otterbein College, but it was cancelled when Otterbein was unable to field a team.

At the end of the season, 16 players received varsity letters, and Marshall Chrisjohn was selected as the team's most valuable player. The players receiving varsity letters were: Wallace Bagozzi, Frank Bielman, Francis Blake, Marshall Chrisjohn, Thomas Connor, Fred Cuthrell, Allan Dow, Andrew Edgerton, James Fears, Masis Godoshian, James Hannan, Richard Hartley, Allen Henderson, John Hochstein, Don Olson, and Tony Yangovyian.

Schedule

References

Wayne
Wayne State Warriors football seasons
College football winless seasons
Wayne Tartars football